"The Miseducation of Lisa Simpson" is the 12th episode of the thirty-first season of the American animated television series The Simpsons, and the 674th episode overall. It aired in the United States on Fox on February 16, 2020. The episode was written by J. Stewart Burns and was directed by Matthew Nastuk.

Plot
The episode begins with a flashback in a German Alpine bar in the winter of 1980, where a police officer demands the Sea Captain and his wife hand over the second half of a treasure map in his possession. Instead, the couple spit vodka into a candle, blinding his fellow guards and starting a fire. Escaping with both halves of the map, the couple head to Springfield in search of the treasure.

Forty years later, having destroyed his marriage over the search, the Sea Captain finally finds the treasure, but Mayor Quimby confiscates it, saying that it now belongs to the town, as it was found within the city limits, which have been redrawn after being warned by the frustrated wife the previous night. With the town unsure of what to do with the money, Marge suggests they build a STEM school to teach children science, technology, engineering, and math to succeed in the future. The residents are initially dismissive of the prospect, but with John Legend and his wife Chrissy Teigen's help, they are encouraged to agree to the idea.

At the new STEM school, run by CEO Zane Furlong, Bart enjoys his new video game-infused education, which allows him to collect badges and skins for his profile, while Lisa is accepted into a gifted class which teaches her about science, coding, math and neural networks. She also learns the school is run by an algorithm to determine the best education for the kids. At a career day meeting at the school, Homer speaks about his job at safety inspector at the nuclear power plant. However, Furlong disparages this as one of several jobs that will be rendered obsolete within a few months, being taken over by automated machines. At the plant, his fears seem confirmed when an automated soda machine which efficiently mixes drinks and flavors is installed in the break room. Homer, seeking to prove that humans can mix drinks better than machines, engages in a stand-off with the soda machine, constantly mixing drinks for hours for the other employees until he collapses from exhaustion and drinking too much soda. Recovering from the fall, Homer feels relief that his job will not be taken over by robots for the moment, unaware that Mr. Burns is beginning a trial run with automated machines in the workplace.

Meanwhile, Lisa discovers that the kids outside of her gifted class are only being trained to do menial jobs in the present day. She attempts to warn the other kids, but Bart convinces them to embrace their education and career prospects. Frustrated at this, Lisa tries to rewrite the algorithm to ensure the other kids have real STEM education, but Bart stops her. They fight until Furlong stops them, and tries to use the algorithm to determine the jobs of the future. To the three's horror, the algorithm can only find one job - caring for senior citizens (with STEM actually standing for Sponge-bathing Toileting Elderly Massage). Bart and Lisa warn the kids through the video PA system and the horrified students proceed to negatively rate the algorithm, causing the server to explode and destroy the school. As Bart and Lisa mope over their worthless future, Homer comforts a saddened Marge, assuring her she will find another way to provide education to the town.

In the tag scene, Furlong, now working as a food delivery driver, visits the Simpsons, delivering hot wings and celery sticks for Homer. When Bart and Lisa ask him what the jobs in the future will be now that the STEM school has been destroyed, he responds that technology is changing and could bring about positive prospects. However, in a vision of the future, sentient soda machines have taken over the planet, forcing residents like adult Bart and Lisa to work as slave bartenders while others like Carl fly around space in luxury cruisers.

Reception
Dennis Perkins of The A.V. Club gave this episode a B− stated "As ‘The Simpsons’ has aged, it’s occasionally fleshed out some of its supporting characters. Sometimes it’s to (with very mixed success) update a problematic stereotype to something resembling cultural acceptability. Other times, the practice smacks of needing to fill out a season order...Then there are those episodes that seize upon a theretofore one-dimensional joke character’s potential to be a bit more of a human being. (Although, technically, still one-dimensional, being a cartoon and all.) Barney’s entry, the hauntingly self-excoriating ‘Pukahontas,’ in the Springfield Film Festival remains an early, legendary example of a sidekick stepping forward to steal the show".

Den of Geek gave this episode a 3 of 5 stars.

References

External links 
 

The Simpsons (season 31) episodes
2020 American television episodes